Mendig is a Verbandsgemeinde ("collective municipality") in the district Mayen-Koblenz, in Rhineland-Palatinate, Germany. The seat of the municipality is in Mendig.

The Verbandsgemeinde Mendig consists of the following Ortsgemeinden ("local municipalities"):

 Bell 
 Mendig
 Rieden 
 Thür 
 Volkesfeld

References

Verbandsgemeinde in Rhineland-Palatinate